The Twelfth Government of the Republic of Croatia was the Croatian Government cabinet led by Prime Minister Zoran Milanović. It was in office from 23 December 2011 until 22 January 2016. It was formed following the November 2011 election won by the centre-left Kukuriku coalition.

By taking office at the age of 45, Zoran Milanović became the second-youngest Prime Minister since Croatia's independence. In addition, his cabinet was also the youngest cabinet in the same period, with an average age of 48. It was surpassed by the succeeding cabinet of Tihomir Orešković, with an average age of 46.

Cabinet members came from three out of the four parties of the winning coalition, leaving only the single-issue Croatian Party of Pensioners (HSU) without representation:

Social Democratic Party of Croatia (SDP)
Croatian People's Party (HNS)
Istrian Democratic Assembly (IDS)

The Milanović cabinet endured a major change when the first deputy prime minister Radimir Čačić resigned in November 2012 following his vehicular manslaughter conviction in Hungary. Also, Milanović's government underwent the most cabinet changes of any Croatian government to date. Namely, nine ministers in total were replaced before the cabinet's term of office expired in January 2016.

Motions of confidence

Changes from the preceding cabinet
The number of ministries rose to 20, up from 16 in the preceding centre-right Cabinet of Jadranka Kosor. None of the previous ministers have retained their position, and several ministries were renamed or had their portfolios reorganized:

The former Ministry of Economy, Labour and Entrepreneurship (MINGORP) was renamed Ministry of Economy, headed by Radimir Čačić. Labour and entrepreneurship portfolios were taken over by two other newly established ministries.
The Ministry of Labour and Pension System was created, taking over the labour portfolio from MINGORP.
The Ministry of Entrepreneurship and Crafts was created, taking over the entrepreneurship portfolio from MINGORP.
The former Ministry of Health and Social Welfare (MZSS) was renamed Ministry of Health, dropping the social welfare portfolio.
The former Ministry of Family, Veterans' Affairs and Intergenerational Solidarity (MOBMS) was renamed Ministry of Social Welfare and Youth, dropping the veterans' affairs portfolio and taking over the social welfare portfolio from the former MZSS.
The Ministry for Veterans' Affairs was created, taking over the portfolio from the former MOMBS.
The former Ministry of Environmental Protection, Physical Planning and Construction (MZOPU) was split into two new ministries - the Ministry of Environmental Protection and Nature and the Ministry of Construction.
The former Ministry of Foreign Affairs and European Integration (MVPEI) was renamed Ministry of Foreign and European Affairs.
The former Ministry of Agriculture, Fisheries and Rural Development was renamed Ministry of Agriculture.
The former Ministry of Regional Development, Forestry and Water Management was renamed Ministry of Regional Development and EU Funds Management.
In addition, the number of Deputy Prime Ministers fell from six under Jadranka Kosor to four, and the number of Deputy PM's holding no other office in the cabinet was reduced from three to just one.

Only two cabinet members have previously held senior executive posts - from 2000 to 2003 Slavko Linić held the position of Deputy Prime Minister and Radimir Čačić was Minister of Public Works, Construction and Reconstruction, both under Prime Minister Ivica Račan.

Party breakdown 
Party breakdown of cabinet ministers:

List of Ministers

History
 In December 2011, the Cabinet had one First Deputy Prime Minister (Radimir Čačić) and three Deputy Prime Ministers: for Neven Mimica this is his only post in the Cabinet, while Radimir Čačić, Branko Grčić and Milanka Opačić serve as both Deputy Prime Ministers and ministers of their respective portfolios.
 In November 2012, Vesna Pusić replaced Čačić as the First Deputy Prime Minister.

Ministers

Former members

References

External links
Official website of the Croatian Government
Chronology of Croatian cabinets at Hidra.hr 

Milanovic, Zoran
2011 establishments in Croatia
Cabinets established in 2011
2016 disestablishments in Croatia
Cabinets disestablished in 2016